This is a list of Canadian films released in 2016:

See also
 2016 in Canada
 2016 in Canadian television

References

External links
Feature Films Released In 2016 With Country of Origin Canada at IMDb

2016

Canada